The 2021–22 season was Newcastle Jets' 21st season since its establishment in 2000. The club participated in the A-League for the 17th time.

Players

Transfers

Transfers in

Transfers out

Contract extensions

Technical staff

Pre-season and friendlies

Competitions

Competition overview
{|class="wikitable" style="text-align:left"
|-
!rowspan=2 style="width:140px;"|Competition
!colspan=8|Record
|-
!style="width:30px;"|
!style="width:30px;"|
!style="width:30px;"|
!style="width:30px;"|
!style="width:30px;"|
!style="width:30px;"|
!style="width:30px;"|
!style="width:50px;"|
|-
|A-League

|-
|FFA Cup

|-
|Australia Cup

|-
!Total

FFA Cup

Australia Cup

A-League

League table

Matches

Statistics

Appearances and goals
Players with no appearances not included in the list.

Clean sheets

Club awards

Newcastle Jets Player of the Month award

''Awarded monthly to the player that was chosen by supporters voting online.

See also 
 2021–22 Newcastle Jets FC (A-League Women) season

References

Newcastle Jets FC seasons
2021–22 A-League Men season by team